Boraginales is an order of flowering plants in the asterid clade. It includes the Boraginaceae and a number of other families, with a total of about 125 genera and 2,700 species. Its herbs, shrubs, trees and lianas (vines) have a worldwide distribution.

Taxonomy

History 

The classification of plants now known as Boraginales dates to the Genera plantarum (1789) when Antoine Laurent de Jussieu named a group of plants Boragineae, to include the genus Borago, now the type genus. However, since the first valid description was by Friedrich von Berchtold and Jan Svatopluk Presl (1820), the botanical authority is given as Juss. ex Bercht. & J.Presl, where the ex refers to the prior authority of Jussieu. Lindley (1853) changed the name to the modern Boraginaceae.

Jussieu divided the Boragineae into five groups. Since then Boraginaceae has been treated either as a large family with several subfamilies, or as a smaller family with several closely related families. The family had been included in a number of higher order taxa, but in 1926 Hutchinson erected a new order, Boraginales, to include the Boraginaceae. 

Although Boraginales was included in a number of taxonomic classifications including Dahlgren (1980), Takhtajan (1997) and Kubitzki (2016) as an order, it was not recognized in either of two major systems, the Cronquist system and the APG system. In the Cronquist system, Boraginaceae (including Cordiaceae, Ehretiaceae, and Heliotropiaceae) and Lennoaceae were placed in the order Lamiales, while the related Hydrophyllaceae was placed in Solanales.

The APG system took a broad view of Boraginaceae (Boraginaceae s.l.), including within it the traditionally recognized families Hydrophyllaceae and Lennoaceae based on recent molecular phylogenies that show that Boraginaceae, as traditionally defined, is paraphyletic over these two families. APG III included Boraginaceae in the Euasterid I (lamiid) clade but this family was otherwise unplaced; its precise relationship to other families in the Euasterid I group remained unclear. In a phylogenetic study of DNA sequences of selected genes, Boraginales was resolved as sister to Lamiales sensu APG, but that result had only 65% maximum likelihood bootstrap support.

In the 2016 APG IV system Boraginales is an order with only one family Boraginaceae, which includes the former family Codonaceae. At the time of the APG IV consensus there was insufficient support to further divide this monophyletic group further. (For a complete discussion of the history of the taxonomy of Boraginales, see )

Boraginales Working Group 

Following the publication of APG IV, a collaborative group along similar lines to the APG, the Boraginales Working Group, was formed to further elucidate the phylogenetic relationships within the Boraginaceae s.l..

As a result it has been split into eleven families, including: Boraginaceae s.s. or s.str., Cordiaceae, Ehretiaceae, Heliotropiaceae, and Hydrophyllaceae. A number of these were monogeneric. Boraginaceae is hard to characterize morphologically if it includes the genera Codon and Wellstedia. Codon was long regarded as an unusual member of Hydrophyllaceae, but in 1998, a molecular phylogenetic study showed that it is closer to Boraginaceae, and both Codon and Wellstedia have been allocated to their own families, Codonaceae and
Wellstediaceae.

The achlorophyllous holoparasites Lennoa and Pholisma were once regarded as a family, Lennoaceae, but it is now known that they form a clade that is nested within Ehretiaceae. Some studies have indicated that Hydrophyllaceae is paraphyletic if the tribe Nameae is included within it, but further studies will be needed to resolve this issue.

The inclusion of the genus Hoplestigma in Boraginales was occasionally doubted until it was strongly confirmed in a cladistic study in 2014. Hoplestigma is the closest relative of Cordiaceae and it has been recommended that the latter be expanded to include it.

Hydrolea was thought to belong in Hydrophyllaceae for more than a century after it was placed there by Asa Gray, but it is now known to belong in the order Solanales as sister to Sphenoclea.

Pteleocarpa was long regarded as an anomaly, and was usually placed in Boraginales, but with considerable doubt. The molecular evidence strongly supports it as sister to Gelsemiaceae, and that family has been expanded to include it.

References

Bibliography 

 
 
 
 
 
 
 
 
 Diane, N., H. Förther, and H. H. Hilger. 2002. A systematic analysis of Heliotropium, Tournefortia, and allied taxa of the Heliotropiaceae (Boraginales) based on ITS1 sequences and morphological data. American Journal of Botany 89: 287-295 (online abstract here).
 Gottschling, M., H. H. Hilger 1, M. Wolf 2, N. Diane. 2001. Secondary Structure of the ITS1 Transcript and its Application in a Reconstruction of the Phylogeny of Boraginales. Plant Biology (Stuttgart) 3: 629-636 (abstract online here)

Historical sources

External links 
 Distribution Map  Genus list  Boraginaceae  Boraginales  Trees  APweb  Missouri Botanical Garden

Asterids
Angiosperm orders